Frank Barnhart Gullum (May 18, 1885 – April 19, 1965) was an American college football, basketball, and baseball coach. He served as the head football coach at Ohio University in Athens, Ohio from 1918 to 1919, compiling a record of 7–5–1. He was the head basketball coach at Ohio for two seasons, from 1918 and 1920, amassing a record of 10–10, and the school's head baseball coach in 1919, tallying a mark of 6–1. Gullum was also a professor of chemistry at the Ohio University. Before coming to Ohio University, he coached football at East High School in Columbus, Ohio, where he mentored Chic Harley, who went on to star at Ohio State University. Gullum died on April 19, 1965, at Sheltering Arms Hospital in Athens.

Head coaching record

College football

College basketball

References

External links
 

1885 births
1965 deaths
American football halfbacks
Basketball coaches from Ohio
Ohio Bobcats baseball coaches
Ohio Bobcats football coaches
Ohio Bobcats football players
Ohio Bobcats men's basketball coaches
Ohio University faculty
High school football coaches in Ohio
People from Hamden, Ohio